Justice of the Range is a 1935 American Western film directed by David Selman, which stars Tim McCoy, Billie Seward, and Ward Bond.

Cast list
 Tim McCoy as Tim Condon
 Billie Seward as Janet McLean
 Ward Bond as Bob Brennan
 Guy Usher as Hadley Graves
 Edward Le Saint as John McLean
Allan Sears as Pinto Carew
 Jack Rockwell as Rawhide
 Jack Rutherford as Lafe Brennan
 George 'Gabby' Hayes as John Coffin known as Pegleg Sanderson

References

External links
 
 
 

Columbia Pictures films
Films directed by David Selman
1935 Western (genre) films
1935 films
American Western (genre) films
American black-and-white films
1930s English-language films
1930s American films